The 2001 Danish Speedway Grand Prix was held in Vojens as part of the Speedway Grand Prix series. It was won by Tony Rickardsson.

Starting positions draw 

The Speedway Grand Prix Commission nominated Hans Clausen and Jesper B.Jensen as Wild Card. Injured Chris Louis and Joe Screen were replaced by Henrik Gustafsson and Grzegorz Walasek.

Heat details

Result
1st: Tony Rickardsson
2nd: Jason Crump
3rd: Tomasz Gollob
4th: Niklas Klingberg

References

Speedway Grand Prix of Denmark
2001 in speedway
2001 in Danish motorsport